Kurdish Alevism or Elewîtî refers to the unique rituals, sacred place practices, mythological discourses and socio-religious organizations among Kurds who adhere to Alevism. Moreover, Kurdish Alevis consider their hereditary sacred lineages as semi-deific figures, is more rooted in nature veneration, and put more emphasis on Pir Sultan Abdal as their religious symbol, unlike Turkish Alevis who emphasize on Haji Bektash Veli. Kurdish Alevis argue that their beliefs are related to Ahl-e Haqq and Yazidism.

The Kurdish Alevi population has experienced religious and ethnic discrimination, oppression and forced assimilation which have significantly impacted their identity. Two Kurdish Alevi rebellions were crushed by Turkish forces in the 20th century; the Koçgiri rebellion in 1921 and the Dersim rebellion in 1937–1938. Kurdish Alevis were also the main victims of the Maraş massacre in 1978.

The heartland and sacred land of Kurdish Alevis is the Dersim region.

Population 
In Turkey, different estimations exist on the Kurdish Alevi population. While Dressler and several other academics stated that about one third or fifth of the Alevi population is Kurdish, respectively, Hamza Aksüt argued in 2015 that a majority of the Alevi population is Kurdish.

Geography 
Tunceli Province is the only Kurdish Alevi-majority province in Turkey. Moreover, there are Kurdish Alevi settlements in the provinces of Adıyaman, Ardahan, Bingöl, Çorum, Elazığ, Erzincan, Erzurum, Gaziantep, Gümüşhane, Kahramanmaraş, Kayseri, Malatya, Muş, Sivas and Yozgat. Outside of Turkey, there are Kurdish Alevis in Afrin, Syria.

History 
Kurdish Alevism was not included in the 13th century Vilayetname by Haji Bektash Veli, indicating that the roots of Kurdish Alevism are not that of Turkish Alevism (also known as Bektashi Alevism). In the 16th century, Kurdish Alevis of Dersim lived under the Emirate of Çemişgezek and the autonomy of this emirate made the community flourish and expand.

After surviving the attempted elimination of Bektashi Alevism by Ottoman Emperor Mahmud II in the early 1800s, the Turkish Haci Bektaş order sought to emerge as the most influential Alevi order. Turkish Alevis would center their beliefs around the dargah which emerged as an Ottoman institution, but Kurdish Alevis continued to hold on to their pre-Ottoman beliefs and thus bypass the institutionalism. In the late 19th century, Emperor Abdul Hamid II did not shy away from using the institutionalized Turkish Alevi beliefs to bektashify the Kurdish Alevis. The Axûçan ocax was the first to be approached and did subject itself to the beliefs of Haji Bektash Veli by introducing the Bektashi beliefs to their religious ceremonies (see Jem). During World War I, Bektashi missionary Mehmet Cemaleddin Efendi stated that the Kurdish Alevis had 'fallen away from the path' and tried to influence their beliefs through the Axûçan ocax on behalf of the Committee of Union and Progress. This period also saw Sunnification of Kurdish Alevis and tribes such as the Reşwan and Şavak have both Alevi and Sunni members today.

In 1921, the Koçgiri rebellion took place with the goal of receiving political autonomy for Kurds and withdrawal of Turkish forces in Kurdistan. The rebellion was put down, but Kurdish Alevis rebelled again in the Dersim rebellion in the 1937, due to the centralist policies of the newly established Turkish republic. This rebellion was also suppressed. Thousands of Alevi Kurds were massacred and the town of Dersim was almost fully destroyed. In the subsequent period from the Dersim rebellion till the 1960s, the Kurds 'went into deep silence'. 

In the 1950 and 1954 general elections, Alevi Kurds voted for the Democrat Party, while the Alevi Kurdish vote would split between the Republican People's Party (CHP), New Turkey Party, Justice Party and Workers' Party of Turkey in the subsequent elections through the 1960s. The Workers' Party of Turkey (TIP) would target the Alevi vote and openly mentioned the rights of Alevis in their 1964 program which culminated with them winning a seat in Malatya Province in the 1965 elections. While the national support for TIP decreased in the 1969 elections, they increased their share of vote among Alevi Kurds. However, due to both the strong association between right-wing parties and Sunni Muslims and the incapability of CHP to challenge the conservative parties, Alevis formed the minority rights-led leftist Unity Party in 1966. Yet, because of its focus on Kemalism and Turkish nationalism, the party did not receive much support from Alevi Kurds. In the 1970s, the politicization of Islam pushed Alevi Kurds towards CHP, however the party was closed down after the 1980 Turkish coup d'état. Alevi Kurds afterwards gave their support to the Social Democratic Populist Party, until CHP was reestablished in 1992. Alevi Kurds not only took part in the formation of the Kurdistan Workers' Party (PKK) but many of them also became leading figures, including Mazlum Doğan, Sakine Cansız, Ali Haydar Kaytan, Mustafa Karasu, Rıza Altun and Bese Hozat. PKK sought to present itself as defenders of Alevi Kurds and targeted the Turkish nationalists who took part in the Çorum massacre. Alevi Kurdish support for PKK would increase throughout the 1980s due to the devastating impact on the Turkish left resulted by the 1980 Turkish coup d'état. In the 2010s, the Peoples' Democratic Party received support from over a majority of Alevi Kurds becoming their main political representative. Another significant event was the election of Alevi Kurdish Gültan Kışanak as co-mayor of the largest Kurdish municipality Diyarbakır in 2014.

Structure 

Traditionally, the socio-religious structure of Kurdish Alevis consist of two hereditary social positions; members of the sacred lineage or ocax and the subordinated to the sacred lineage or taliw. By the end of the 20th century, this system had been gravely impacted by cultural destruction and the taliw has gained influence in regard to religion and identity politics. Taliws have since the anti-Alevi violence in the 1990s strengthened the cultural identity of Kurdish Alevis.

Ocax 
Ocax refers to various sacred lineages in Kurdish Alevism. The ocaxs are: Axûçan, Babamansûr, Sînemîllî, Celal Abbas, Kurêsû, Cemal Avdel, Dewrêş Gewr, Dewrêş Cemal, Seyit Sabun, Sari Saltik, Ûryan Xizir, Şeyh Çoban and Şix Delîlê Berxêcan. Since sacred lineage and religious rank is determined by tribal affiliation, it is fairly easy to identify which individual has which religious position in which ocax.

Taliw and sayyid 
Taliw is a term used to encompass every Kurdish Alevi person who receives religious services. In Kurdish Alevism, most people only receive services, while a small segment both receive and give. This latter small segment is called sayyid. For the taliw population to receive a religious service, the sayyid must travel to their place of residence. Traditionally, the sayyid therefore had to travel from village to village to offer their service.

Rawyer 
Raywer or rêber is a term used to describe the sayyid who prepares and serves the religious functions and therefore leads the others down the right path. The raywer also has the role of explaining the religion to its members. The raywer is chosen from a sayyid ocax at birth and the title is lifelong. Nonetheless, the person can always choose not to practice his raywership.

Pîr 
It is believed that some members of the sayyid have spiritual power through bloodline. While the raywer guides the members of Alevism practically, the pîr thus guides spiritually.

Murşîd 
Murşîd is the highest rank in the ocax systems. The murşîd resides over the jurisprudent element of the system and has the role of appeal. For example, if a taliw feels injustice regarding the decision of a pîr, they can appeal to the murşîd.

Jiare 

Jiare are the sacred places which Alevi Kurds worship. This includes trees, mountains, rocks, caves, rivers, lakes, fountains, the sun and the moon that are each related to a semi-deific figure. These places and objects are thus sacred and some objects are moreover  considered dangerous and therefore kept by the rawyer, pîr or murşîd. Jiare can be utilized to treat people who suffer from paralysis or mental issues. Two important jiare are Munzur River and Duzgin Bawo, both located in Tunceli Province.

Munzur River 
Munzur River is located near Ovacık and a place of pilgrimage and ritual slaughter and people pray to God through the various jiare in the region. Munzur Bawa was the name of a shepherd who was believed to be able to practice miracles.

Xizir 
Xizir is an important religious figure who is considered to have spiritual power and an emanation of God and a batin of Ali. It is believed that Xizir travels between earth and heaven and during travels has generated numerous jiare - including oases and springs from where his feet touched the ground.

Xizir Fountain is one of these jiare located in Varto and is also visited by Sunni Kurds.

Another jiare related to Xizir is Gola Çeto in Pülümür which is the location where it is believed Xizir meets Elijah once a year from 13 February and the subsequent three days. During this period, Kurdish Alevis fast and it is believed that the meeting ends winter.

Notes

Bibliography

Further reading 

 
 

Religion in Kurdistan
Alevism
Religion in Turkey
History of the Kurdish people
History of Tunceli Province
Ethnic religion
Religion in Syria
Kurdish culture